Le Monde Chico is the debut studio album by French cloud rap duo PNL. It was released on 30 October 2015 through the duo's own QLF Records. The album was preceded by the singles "Plus Tony que Sosa", "Le monde ou rien", "J'suis PNL", "Dans ta rue", "Oh lala" and "Tempête".

Track listing

Charts

Weekly charts

Year-end charts

Certifications

References

External links
Official website 

2015 debut albums
PNL (rap duo) albums